Bingourou Kamara (21 October 1996) is a professional footballer who plays as a goalkeeper for  club Montpellier. Born in France, he plays for the Senegal national team.

Club career
Kamara is a youth exponent from Tours. He made his Ligue 2 debut for the club on 31 October 2014 against Laval, playing the full match in a 2–1 away defeat.

On 24 December 2021, Strasbourg agreed to loan Kamara to Belgian club Charleroi for the rest of the season. 

On 1 September 2022, Kamara signed for Ligue 1 club Montpellier.

International career
Born in France, Kamara is of Mauritanian and Senegalese descent. He was a youth international for France. He switched sporting nationalities, first representing Senegal in a 3–1 friendly loss to Morocco on 9 October 2020.

Career statistics

Club

Honours
Strasbourg
Coupe de la Ligue: 2018–19

References

External links
 
 

1996 births
Living people
People from Longjumeau
Citizens of Senegal through descent
Senegalese footballers
Senegal international footballers
French footballers
France youth international footballers
Senegalese people of Mauritanian descent
French sportspeople of Mauritanian descent
French sportspeople of Senegalese descent
Association football goalkeepers
Ligue 1 players
Ligue 2 players
Championnat National 3 players
Belgian Pro League players
Sainte-Geneviève Sports players
Tours FC players
RC Strasbourg Alsace players
R. Charleroi S.C. players
Montpellier HSC players
Footballers from Essonne
French expatriate footballers
Senegalese expatriate footballers
Expatriate footballers in Belgium
French expatriate sportspeople in Belgium
Senegalese expatriate sportspeople in Belgium